Murner See is a lake in Wackersdorf, Bavaria, Germany. At an elevation of 395 m, its surface area is 0.94 km².

Lakes of Bavaria